Group B of the 1995 FIFA Women's World Cup took place from 6 to 10 June 1995. The group consisted of Canada, England, Nigeria and Norway.

Standings

Matches
All times listed are local, CEST (UTC+2).

Norway vs Nigeria

England vs Canada

Norway vs England

Nigeria vs Canada

Norway vs Canada

Nigeria vs England

References

External links
FIFA Women's World Cup Sweden 1995, FIFA.com

1995 FIFA Women's World Cup
Canada at the 1995 FIFA Women's World Cup
England at the 1995 FIFA Women's World Cup
Nigeria at the 1995 FIFA Women's World Cup
Norway at the 1995 FIFA Women's World Cup